Dominion III is an Austrian industrial music band created in 1998.

History 
The band was started by Tharen (real name Alexander Opitz) in 1998 shortly after his other band, Dargaard, released their debut. Dominion III (also known as Dominion³ but this name is no longer used) was his expression into heavier industrial music to express his feelings. As with Dargaard, it also features the vocals of Elisabeth Toriser.

Tharen dubbed the music 'apocalyptic electronic music' with their debut release The Hand and the Sword. The music was expressive and heavy, and dealt with dark and angry themes. Tharen's music often displays traits of this, coming from a black metal background. The band was signed to Napalm Records as were Tharen's other musical projects.

The second release came two years after The Hand and the Sword, titled Life Has Ended Here. The music displayed a more industrial edge and was far more guitar-driven. This was because of the addition to the line-up of Jörg Lanz, who was in Tharen's black metal band Amestigon. The music continued to display an aggressive nature combined with sinister soundscapes.

Tharen has spoken of moving Dominion III to another record label, one more centered on industrial music. In 2006, Dominion III left Naplam Records but no news has been released of a new record label at the time of writing.

Current line-up
Tharen - Composer, Vocals
Elisabeth Toriser - Vocals
Jörg Lanz - Guitar/Bass (on Life Has Ended Here)

Discography
The Hand and the Sword  (2000)
Life Has Ended Here (2002)

References

External links
Official Homepage

Austrian alternative rock groups
Musical groups established in 1998